Tim Driesen is a Belgian actor, notable for roles in both musicals, plays, and television serials. 
He has composed a full-scale musical as well as a number of pop-songs. In 2007, he created the role of Adrian Banks (a character based on pop-star Mark Owen) in the Take That musical, Never Forget. Take That member Gary Barlow, who wrote the majority of the production's musical numbers, said jokingly of the cast: "I'm just worried that they're better than us". When the musical opened, Driesen appeared with fellow cast members Dean Chisnall, Craig Els, Stephane Anelli, Eaton James and Nancy Sullivan on ITV's GMTV performing the show's title song, "Never Forget".
He also appeared in the UK tour of Starlight Express. Driesen appeared in the television series, The Bubbles.

He is also noted for his voice-over work in televised commercials.

Driesen appeared as Phoebus in Notre Dame de Paris in Belgium (Antwerp & Ghent). He played a role for which he won 'Best Supporting Actor in a Musical' at the VMPs (Flemish Musical Awards).

His musical 'My Super Girlfriend' (previously known as 'Super Alice Smith') has been workshopped and showcased in conjunction with 'Perfect Pitch' at Trafalgar Studios in London

Tim has played Joey Primo in Rock of Ages in London's West End. He was alternate for lead character Drew, as well as  understudying and regularly performing as Stacee Jaxx.

Tim then did Jersey Boys in the Netherlands in which he plays the lead character Frankie Valli. The cast performed at Musical Sing-A-Long on Dutch TV in September 2013.

For the past couple of years he has been performing in Disney's The Lion King, first in The Netherlands and currently on the UK tour.

Background
Originally from Belgium, Driesen is based in London in the UK. He trained at Laine Theatre Arts in Epsom.

Credits

Theatre
 Joey Primo U/S Stacee Jaxx, Drew* Rock of Ages (Garrick theatre)
 Young Ken Barlow in Street of Dreams (musical) UK & Ireland
 Alternate Phoebus/Gringoire in Notre-Dame de Paris (musical) Asian Tour
 Galileo in We Will Rock You (musical) (Antwerp, Belgium)
Phoebus in Notre-Dame de Paris (musical) Antwerp & Ghent, Belgium
 Adrian Banks/Mark Owen in Never Forget (2007 UK tour and original West End run.)
Taking solos in "Pray", "Take That & Party" and "Never Forget", and also performing in numbers such as "It Only Takes a Minute", "Babe", Back for Good, "I Found Heaven" and "Relight My Fire".
 Joseph in Joseph and the Amazing Technicolor Dreamcoat Mark in Rent Nintendo, and understudy to Rusty the Steam Engine (played by actor Oliver Thornton), Caboose and Flat-Top the Brick Truck in Starlight Express  (2006 UK tour.)Tim Driesen performed in numbers such as Starlight Express, Starlight Sequence, Only He and Light at the End of the Tunnel during his run in Starlight Express. Father Alexander and understudy to Eddy in Mamma Mia! (West End.)
 Mephistopheles Smith in Mephistopheles Smith Donny Osmond and David Cassidy in Thank You for the Music Riff Raff and Rocky in The Rocky Horror Show Bat Boy: The Musical (frequently playing the title role)
 Narrator in Glory Hallelujah 2000 (Belgian Production.)
 Demetrius in A Midsummer Night's Dream Robot Three Six in The Lost Christmas a musical by Laurence Mark Wythe
 Jim in Jet Set Go! a musical by Jake Brunger and Pippa Cleary
 Jack in Jack and the Beanstalk (York, England, 2009)In which Driesen sang Go the Distance From Disney's Hercules. Frankie Valli in the Dutch version of "Jersey Boys"

Television
 Behind the Musical: The Making of Never Forget The Bubbles (1991 TV series)
 This Morning GMTV Loose Women Idols 2004 (performed 'Breathe Easy')

Film/DVD
 Never Forget as Adrian Banks/Mark Owen (DVD)Filmed at the opening night at Manchester Opera House. Driesen also appears in an interview on the DVD's bonus material.Recordings

Albums
 In My Corner 
 Never Forget original cast CD, singing the role of Adrian Banks/Mark Owen
 Mephistophles Smith EP
 Belgian Soldier, Castle Video's
 Glory Hallelujah 2000 revival cast CD
 The Bubbles

Songs

 "Small Town Girl" (from My Super Girlfriend) 
 '"It's All Cliché" (from My Super Girlfriend) 
 "My Super Girlfriend" (from My Super Girlfriend) 
 "Evil Has Many Faces" (from My Super Girlfriend)

External links
 Tim Driesen's official website
 
 Official 'My Super Girlfriend' website

References

1978 births
Living people
Belgian male actors
Belgian composers
Male composers
People from Herentals
21st-century Belgian male singers
21st-century Belgian singers